Cirripectes castaneus, the chestnut eyelash-blenny, is a species of combtooth blenny found in coral reefs in the western Pacific and Indian oceans.  This species reaches a length of  TL.

References

External links
 

castaneus
Fish described in 1836